Sachidanand Pandey (born 1 July 1996) is an Indian cricketer. He made his first-class debut for Services in the 2016–17 Ranji Trophy on 20 October 2016. He made his List A debut for Services in the 2016–17 Vijay Hazare Trophy on 4 March 2017. He made his Twenty20 debut for Services in the 2017–18 Zonal T20 League on 13 January 2018.

References

External links
 

1996 births
Living people
Indian cricketers
Services cricketers
Place of birth missing (living people)